Youngs Creek is a stream in Orange County, in the U.S. state of Indiana.

Youngs Creek was named for William Young, a pioneer who settled near the creek about 1816.

See also
List of rivers of Indiana

References

Rivers of Orange County, Indiana
Rivers of Indiana